The October 2017 North American storm complex was a major explosive cyclogenesis storm, also called bomb, in the Northeastern United States and Atlantic Canada from October 29–31, 2017. It brought heavy rain and extremely strong winds, and power outages, over 1.3 million customers being without power in the Northeast. Hurricane-force wind gusts resulted in downed trees, power lines, and widespread damage to buildings. The number of power outages in the state of Maine surpassed the Ice Storm of 1998.

Meteorological history
On October 29, an extratropical cyclone powered partially by leftover moisture from Tropical Storm Philippe moved northeast over South Florida and began to move up the U.S. East Coast. The moisture from the system soon began to feed into a cold front, resulting in rapid intensification of the low pressure as it moved up the coast. After maintaining its intensity for some time, it then began to rapidly weaken, before dissipating on October 31.

Preparations and impact

Mid-Atlantic states
Downed trees and power lines were reported as a result of the storm in the Washington, D.C. area as well.

New England

In Maine, over 400,000 power outages were reported, some lasting over a week. Surpassing the Ice Storm of 1998, the storm became the largest weather-related power outage event in Maine history. There was widespread tree damage across the state, and some roads in coastal regions of the state were impassable for over a week.

In New Hampshire, nearly 300,000 power outages were reported, and the storm was the fourth-largest power outage in New Hampshire history. Numerous roads throughout the state were closed by washouts from heavy rain or from fallen trees, slowing initial damage assessment response. Damage in New Hampshire totalled $4.1 million.

Approximately 50,000 customers lost power in the state, and most had power restored within the next five days. Many schools were closed throughout the state, and the state's largest utility reported that over 500 field crews were restoring power on October 30. Damage amounted to $3 million.

In Massachusetts, damage amounted to $350,000.

Eastern Canada
Heavy rain fell in Quebec and Ontario, resulting in power outages and travel problems.

See also

Tropical Storm Philippe
Ice Storm of 1998
November 2009 nor'easter
April 12–13, 2020 nor'easter

References

External links
 Archive of Storm Summaries from the Weather Prediction Center

2017 meteorology
Nor'easters
Extratropical cyclones
Floods in the United States